Consumer Appreciation is the first studio album by American indie-folk group Insomniac Folklore. It was recorded by Chris Lofton and Tyler Hentschel at Stick Figure Studio in Roseburg, Oregon and was released in January 2003.

Track listing

Personnel

 Insomniac Folklore
 Tyler Hentschel – Vocals, Guitar, Keyboard, lyricist, composer, songwriter
 Chris Lofton – Bass, Drums
 Sam Ellis – Guitar, Vocals

References

2003 debut albums
Insomniac Folklore albums